State Highway 149 (SH 149) is a state highway that runs from Carthage to Longview in east Texas.

History
SH 149 was originally designated on March 19, 1930 along its current route, replacing SH 26A. On August 4, 1932, SH 149 was extended north to Daingerfield. On June 25, 1935, everything north of Longview was cancelled (this section north of Longview was intended to be cancelled on August 15, 1933), but was restored on June 16, 1936. The northern extension was transferred to SH 26 on September 26, 1939. On October 28, 1987, a loop around Carthage was completed, with SH 149 being routed around the western side of town along Loop 436.  The old routing that entered Carthage was re-designated Spur 572. Loop 436 was cancelled on September 25, 1989 to remove concurrent mileage with SH 149.

Route description
SH 149 begins at an interchange with US 59 (Future I-369 corridor) on the south side of Carthage. Along the west side of the beltway around town, the highway becomes concurrent with US 79. At the interchange with Spur 572, the route leaves the beltway and heads northwest. It runs through Beckville and intersects SH 43 in Tatum. In Lakeport, near the East Texas Regional Airport, the highway intersects and runs concurrent with SH 322. It crosses over the Sabine River as it leaves town. At the intersection of Estes Parkway and Eastman Road, north of Lakeport, SH 149 splits from SH 322 and heads to the northeast. It passes under Interstate 20, only interchanging it with the north and south access roads. From there, it runs concurrent with US 259, heading through the east side of Longview. SH 149 reaches its northern terminus at US 80. The road from there continues north only as US 259.

Major intersections

References

Transportation in Panola County, Texas
Transportation in Rusk County, Texas
Transportation in Gregg County, Texas
149